Yuen Long may refer to:

 Yuen Long, for the area in Hong Kong
 Yuen Long District, for the district in Hong Kong
 Yuen Long District Council, the district council for the Yuen Long District, Hong Kong
 Yuen Long FC, a Hong Kong professional football club
 Yuen Long Highway, an expressway part of Hong Kong Route 9 (New Territories Circular Road)
 Yuen Long Industrial Estate, an industrial estate in Yuen Long, Hong Kong
 Yuen Long Kau Hui, for the old market in Yuen Long, Hong Kong
 Yuen Long New Town, for the new town in Yuen Long, Hong Kong
 Yuen Long Park, a park in Yuen Long, Hong Kong
 Yuen Long Plain, for the plain in Hong Kong
 Yuen Long Stadium, a multi-purpose stadium in Yuen Long, Hong Kong
 Yuen Long station, the Hong Kong MTR station called Yuen Long
 Yuen Long stop, the Hong Kong LRT stop called Yuen Long
 Yuen Long Town, for the central town of Yuen Long, Hong Kong
 2019 Yuen Long attack, for an incident that occurred during the 2019 Hong Kong anti-extradition bill protests